Asbo4Life  is the fourth studio album by Welsh hip-hop/rap group Goldie Lookin Chain. It is noted for a change of style musically and is the only GLC album not to contain any samples. It is said to be Eggsy's least favourite GLC album and was recorded in a house in Newport which was turned into a recording studio. Mike Balls almost died during the recording of the album.

Track listing 
"Mister Faharenheit" - 2:52
"Everybody is a DJ"
"Disguise"
"By Any Means Necessary"
"Welcome To Germany"
"Apathy"
"3D"
"Nothing Ever Happens"
"Space Police"
"Rollin"
"Strobe Lights"
"Unemployed and Over Drawn"
"Garlic Bread"
"New Day"

References 

2009 albums
Goldie Lookin Chain albums